Leif Målberg (born 1 September 1945) is a former Swedish footballer.

Målberg played his whole career for IF Elfsborg from 1965 to 1980. He was one of the club's most important defenders at the time. He played 337 games for his club.

He was a member of the Sweden national football team in the 1970 FIFA World Cup.

References

External links

1945 births
Living people
Swedish footballers
Sweden international footballers
1970 FIFA World Cup players
Allsvenskan players
IF Elfsborg players
Swedish football managers
IF Elfsborg managers
Association football defenders